The Nakhimov Naval School in Saint Petersburg is a military boarding school of the Russian Navy.

Overview

The Leningrad Nakhimov Naval School was created in accordance with the decree of the Council of People's Commissars on 21 June 1944 and the People's Commissariat for Military and Naval Affairs. The date of publication of the order (23 June), is set as the annual holiday of the school. It was the first Nakhimov Naval School to be formed, with the school being named after admiral of the Imperial Russian Navy Pavel Nakhimov. On 18 September 1944, the first admission to the school took place. In the first academic year, 408 pupils studied at the school. In 1948, the first graduation of cadets took place. In 2016, the Vladivostok Presidential Cadet School and the Sevastopol Presidential Cadet School became branches of the school. By order of President Vladimir Putin on 1 September 2017, the Murmansk Nakhimov Naval School became the third branch of the school. On 25 May 2017, it was awarded the public Order "To the Glory of the Russian Fleet" 1st Degree.

Currently, the term of study at the school is 7 years. It is among the first pre-university educational institutions of the Ministry of Defense of Russia to start the academic year. In time for the 2017–2018 academic year, due to the renovation of the main building of the school, the junior courses of the school were held on the territory of the Saint Petersburg Suvorov Military School.

The school has been representing the Soviet Navy at military parades on Moscow's Red Square and Saint Petersburg's Palace Square on many occasions (Victory Day (9 May), October Revolution Day (7 November), and International Workers Day (1 May)). In 1996, the parade regiment of the school received a personal certificate of the Supreme Commander-in-Chief (then Boris Yeltsin) for its march in the 1996 Moscow Victory Day Parade. In 2013, by order Minister of Defense Sergey Shoygu, it returned to the Moscow Victory Day Parade. In 2020, thirty-one cadets of the school came down with a case of COVID-19 while preparing for the postponed victory parade that year.

School Commandants

 Rear Admiral Nikolai Izachik (1944-1949)
  Rear Admiral Grigory Grishchenko (1949-1961)
  Rear Admiral Nikolai Bachkov (1961-1963)
  Rear Admiral Vyacheslav Bakardzhiev (1963-1971)
  Rear Admiral Pavel Belyaev (1971-1976)
 Rear Admiral Nikolai Fedorov (1976-1979)
  Rear Admiral Lev Stolyarov (1979-1990)
  Rear Admiral Nikolai Malov (1990-2001)
  Rear Admiral Aleksandr Bukin (2001-2007)
 Rear Admiral Andrey Yurchenko (2007-2008)
 Captain 1st Rank of the Reserve Nikolai Andreyev (2008—2013)
 Rear Admiral of the Reserve Aleksey Surov (2013—2018)
 Rear Admiral of the Reserve Anatoly Minakov (2018—2020)
 Vice Admiral of the Reserve Aleksey Maksimchuk (2020—present)

Notable graduates
Sergei Zheleznyak, former member of the State Duma.
Andrei Volozhinsky, former First Deputy Commander-in-Chief of the Russian Navy.
Timur Apakidze, Russian-Georgian fighter pilot who was the founder of the modern Russian Naval Aviation.
Vladimir Vysotskiy (admiral), former Commander of the Russian Northern Fleet.
Nikolai Maksimov, former head of the Navy Shipbuilding and Weapons Research Institute
Sergei Pinchuk, former commander of the Caspian Flotilla.
Aleksandr Berzin, a Hero of the Russian Federation
Valery Varfolomeyev, Commander of the 11th Submarine Division of the Northern Fleet.
Igor Schvede, Representative of the Estonian Defence Forces to NATO.

See also
 Kronstadt Sea Cadet Corps
 Suvorov Military School
 Naval Cadet Corps (Russia)

Links
 Official Website of the school

References

Nakhimov Naval School
Educational institutions established in 1944
1945 establishments in the Soviet Union
Cultural heritage monuments of federal significance in Saint Petersburg